Brigadier General Richard W. Fellows (September 7, 1914– August 7, 1998) was a United States Air Force officer who served during World War II and the Cold War.

He was born in Algoma, Wisconsin, in 1914. He graduated from Algoma High School in 1931 and attended the University of Wisconsin for a year and a half.

Early career
In 1933, he received a Congressional appointment to the United States Military Academy. He graduated In 1937, ranking 88th in a class of 298 and assigned to the Cavalry. Second Lieutenant Fellows' first duty station was Randolph Field, Texas, where he attended pilot training school. He completed his advanced training in Pursuit at Kelly Field, Texas, and received his pilot wings in 1938.  He eventually was rated as a command pilot.

Lieutenant Fellows' first assignment after Kelly Field was Nichols Field in the Philippines. He earned a combat observer rating as a member of the 2d Observation Squadron there and transferred to the Philippine Air Depot, which he commanded as a captain upon outbreak of World War II.

Battle of the Philippines (1941–1942)
In December 1941 when Nichols Field became untenable, he transferred his depot to the outskirts of Manila. Depot assembly and repair operations were conducted along boulevards used as runways and in various buildings converted to shops. Although Manila was declared an "Open City" December 25, 1941, the depot continued its operations and evacuation activities to the Bataan Peninsula up until January 1, 1942, when the last P-40 Warhawk under repair was flown to Bataan as the victorious Japanese were entering the city.

On Bataan, Captain Fellows, after reorganizing the remnant of the Philippine Air Depot, was assigned as deputy of the 24th Pursuit Group organized as Infantry and charged with a beach defense mission. At the time of the fall of Bataan, Captain Fellows was serving as a pilot in the "Bamboo Fleet", composed of a handful of small civilian and military aircraft carrying supplies into Bataan from Southern Philippine bases and evacuating selected persons from the peninsula.

His last flight from Bataan was made the morning of April 8, 1942, the day the fighting lines collapsed. Bataan surrendered the following day.

Mediterranean Theater
After several months of hospitalization Captain Fellows was returned to duty in August 1942 as squadron commander in the 30th Bombardment Group, which he later commanded, at March Field, California. He attended the First Air Staff Officers' course sponsored by General Arnold for combat experienced officers in the fall of 1943 and was assigned, following the courses, to the Mediterranean Theatre.

As deputy and commander of the 376th Bombardment Group, he was awarded the Silver Star, Distinguished Flying Gross with oak leak cluster, and Air Medal with four oak leaf clusters for his services. Other awards or honors for this period included a combat promotion to the grade of colonel, the French Croix de Guerre with Palm, the War Cross (Greece), and Pilot Wings of the Royal Yugoslav Air Force.

He was appointed Deputy A-3 of the Fifteenth Air Force in Italy, returning to the United States and duty in the War Department General Staff after the war in Europe was concluded.

United States Air Force
He attended Stanford University, receiving a master's degree in the School of Education in 1948. He served a two-month internship in the personnel departments of Douglas Aircraft Corporation and the Standard Oil Company of California, after which he was assigned in personnel and programming activities in Headquarters Continental Air Command at Mitchel Air Force Base, New York, until 1952.

He graduated from the Air War College in 1953 and spent the next three years in Newfoundland as commander, first of Pepperrell Air Force Base and later Ernest Harmon Air Force Base.

He was assigned to the Directorate of Programs in Headquarters U.S. Air Force in 1956, serving as deputy director until 1961 when he was reassigned to Headquarters Air Force Logistics Command, Wright-Patterson Air Force Base, Ohio, as deputy director of maintenance engineering. He was promoted to brigadier general in May 1960.

From July 1962 until November of the same year, General Fellows was deputy director of plans and programs at Headquarters Air Force Logistics Command Headquarters. In November 1962 he became director.  In July 1964 he became the deputy director for logistics, Joint Staff, Organization of the Joint Chiefs of Staff.

He retired on 1 September 1966.

Decorations
 Silver Star
 Distinguished Flying Cross with oak leaf cluster
 Air Medal with four oak leaf clusters
 Commendation Ribbon
 Distinguished Unit Badge with four oak leaf clusters
 American Defense Service Medal with "Foreign Service" clasp
 American Campaign Medal
 Asiatic-Pacific Campaign Medal with campaign star
 European-African-Middle Eastern Campaign Medal with nine campaign stars
 World War II Victory Medal
 National Defense Service Medal with star
 Air Force Longevity Service Award Ribbon with four oak leaf clusters
 War Cross (Greece)
 French Croix de Guerre with palm
 Philippine Presidential Unit Citation
 Philippine Defense Medal with star

Effective dates of promotion
Rank Temporary Permanent
 Second Lieutenant 12 Jun 1937 12 Jun 1937
 First Lieutenant 12 Jun 1940 12 Jun 1940
 Captain 9 Sep 1940 22 Jul 1947
 Major 12 May 1942
 Lieutenant Colonel 9 Sep 1943 2 Jul 1948
 Colonel 9 Nov 1944 28 Jul 1951
 Brigadier General 4 May 1960 1 Sep 1966

References

1914 births
1998 deaths
University of Wisconsin–Madison alumni
Recipients of the Silver Star
Recipients of the Distinguished Flying Cross (United States)
Recipients of the Air Medal
Recipients of the War Cross (Greece)
Recipients of the Croix de Guerre 1939–1945 (France)
United States Army Air Forces personnel of World War II
United States Air Force generals
People from Algoma, Wisconsin
Military personnel from Wisconsin
Air War College alumni